When You Come Home is a World War I song. It was released in 1918 under Columbia Records. Vocalist Henry Burr performed the song. In August 1918, the song reached the number seven spot on the US song charts.

References

1918 songs
Songs of World War I
Song articles with missing songwriters